Nettie McKenzie Clapp (August 22, 1868 – July 30, 1935) was a member of the Ohio House of Representatives. In 1922 she became one of the first women elected to the Ohio General Assembly. Clapp was the first woman legislator to sponsor a bill in the Ohio General Assembly and the first woman to serve on the Republican National Convention Executive Committee in 1924.

Clapp served four consecutive terms in the Ohio Legislature from 1922 to 1930 representing Cuyahoga County.

References

External links
Profile on the Ohio Ladies' Gallery website
Nettie Clapp Stove Design
Photo - Nettie Clapp and her husband

1868 births
1935 deaths
Republican Party members of the Ohio House of Representatives
Women state legislators in Ohio
20th-century American politicians
Politicians from Cincinnati
20th-century American women politicians